Moshe Abutbul (born 11 August 1984) is an Israeli professional association footballer who plays for Hapoel Ra'anana. He plays as a central midfielder.

Biography

Playing career 
After being promoted from the F.C. Ashdod youth team, Abutbul made his professional debut on 16 August 2003 in a Toto Cup match against Maccabi Herzliya.

Statistics 
As to 25 August 2014

References 

1984 births
Living people
Israeli footballers
F.C. Ashdod players
Israel under-21 international footballers
Hapoel Ra'anana A.F.C. players
Hapoel Ramat Gan F.C. players
Hapoel Ashkelon F.C. players
Maccabi Ironi Bat Yam F.C. players
Hapoel Nir Ramat HaSharon F.C. players
Hapoel Ironi Kiryat Shmona F.C. players
Israeli Premier League players
Liga Leumit players
Israeli people of Moroccan-Jewish descent
Footballers from Ashdod
Association football midfielders